Vaivara Parish is a former municipality of Ida-Viru County in northern Estonia. It had a population of 1,800 (2008) and an area of 397.97 km². Vaivara Parish was abolished in 2017 and its territory became a part of Narva-Jõesuu.

Settlements
Small boroughs
Olgina (552 inhabitants), Sinimäe (430 inhabitants)

Villages
Arumäe, Auvere, Hiiemetsa, Hundinurga, Laagna, Kudruküla, Meriküla, Mustanina, Peeterristi, Perjatsi, Pimestiku, Puhkova, Soldina, Sõtke, Tõrvajõe, Udria, Vaivara, Vodava

See also
Blue Mountains
Battle of Narva - Battle of the Tannenbergstellung (1944)
Vaivara concentration camp
Sirgala training area

References

External links 
Official website

 
Former municipalities of Estonia